The following highways are numbered 209:

Canada
 Manitoba Provincial Road 209
 Nova Scotia Route 209
 Prince Edward Island Route 209
 Quebec Route 209 
 Saskatchewan Highway 209

China
 China National Highway 209

Costa Rica
 National Route 209

India
 National Highway 209 (India)

Japan
 Japan National Route 209

United States
 U.S. Route 209 —Pennsylvania and New York
 Alabama State Route 209
 California State Route 209 (former)
 Colorado State Highway 209
 Connecticut Route 209
 Florida State Road 209 (former)
 Georgia State Route 209 (former)
 K-209 (Kansas highway)
 Kentucky Route 209
 Maine State Route 209
 Massachusetts Route 209 (former)
 M-209 (Michigan highway) (former)
 Montana Secondary Highway 209
 New Mexico State Road 209
 New York State, U.S. Route 209
 North Carolina Highway 209
 Ohio State Route 209
 Oklahoma State Highway 209
 Oregon Route 209 (former)
 Tennessee State Route 209
 Texas State Highway 209 (former)
 Texas State Highway Loop 209
 Utah State Route 209
 Virginia State Route 209
 Washington State Route 209 (former)